Brookhouse Brook is a 6.23 km (3.87 mi) long stream (brook) in the Epping Forest District of Essex, England, that is a tributary to the River Roding.

Course 
Rising from a drainage basin in Epping Forest near Theydon Bois Golf Club, Brookhouse Brook flows an easterly course under the M11 motorway via a culvert, then continues on its course through the hamlet of Steward's Green. After reaching Fiddlers Hamlet, Brookhouse Brook turns south, flowing under the M11 motorway once again and through Theydon Garnon, before flowing into the River Roding at Abridge.

Water quality 
Water quality of the brook in 2019, according to the Environment Agency, a non-departmental public body sponsored by the United Kingdom's Department for Environment, Food and Rural Affairs:

In April 1985, an accident on the M11 motorway led to approximately 100 gallons of the insecticide chlorpyrifos spilling into the Brookhouse Brook, subsequently flowing into the River Roding and killing thousands of fish and millions of invertebrates. This accounted for approximately 90 percent of the fish population.

References 

Rivers of Essex